Manganese is a chemical element that is designated by the symbol Mn and has an atomic number of 25. It is found as the free element in nature (often in combination with iron), and in many minerals. The free element is a metal with important industrial metal alloy uses. Manganese ions are variously colored, and are used industrially as pigments and as oxidation chemicals. Manganese (II) ions function as cofactors for a number of enzymes; the element is thus a required trace mineral for all known living organisms.

List of countries
This is a list of countries by manganese ore mining in 2015, based on United States Geological Survey accessed in 2016.

References

Lists of countries by mineral production
Production by country